B. Rajendraprasad (18 March 1961 – 4 January 2023), popularly known as Beeyar Prasad, was an Indian Malayalam lyricist and poet. He made his debut in the Malayalam film industry through 2003 film Kilichundan Mampazham which was directed by Priyadarshan and music was composed by Vidyasagar.

Life and career 

Prasad was born in the village called Monkombu of Kuttanad in Kerala. He was a multi-talented person who completed his B.A Literature in Malayalam. Prasad has written many librettos for the Kathakali dance.

In the year 1993, Beeyar Prasad scripted the movie Johny, which won Kerala State Film Award for Best Children's Film. In the year 2001, Prasad had played a role, Narayanan in the film Theerthadanam starred by Jayaram and Suhasini Maniratnam. He made his debut in the Malayalam film industry through 2003 Malayalam movie Kilichundan Mampazham  which was directed by Priyadarshan and music was composed by Vidyasagar.

Prasad died from complications of a stroke in Changanassery, Kottayam district, on 4 January 2023, at the age of 61.

Filmography

References 

1961 births
2023 deaths
Malayalam-language lyricists
Malayalam-language writers
People from Alappuzha district